Peter Ross Leckie (born 6 May 1957) is a Scottish writer of historical novels, best known for his Carthage trilogy.

Biography
Leckie attended Drumtochty Castle Preparatory School and Fettes College. He studied classics at Corpus Christi College, Oxford, where he was also President of the Junior Common Room. He met Vera Wülfing, a student of languages from Germany, and they married in 1979. They moved to Scotland in 1981. The couple had four children. In 1995 Leckie married Sophie Drinkall, and they had six children. They divorced in 2019.

Works

Carthage Trilogy
 Hannibal (also as Hannibal: A novel)
 Scipio Africanus (also as Scipio: A novel)
 Carthage

Non-fiction
 The Bluffer's Guide to The Classics
 Grampian: A Country in Miniature
 The Gourmet's Companion

References

External links
 Review: Ross Leckie's Carthage

Scottish novelists
Scottish historical novelists
Writers of historical fiction set in antiquity
People educated at Fettes College
Alumni of Corpus Christi College, Oxford
People educated at Drumtochty Castle Preparatory School
1957 births
Living people